Richard Alvey may refer to:
Richard Alvey (priest) (died 1584), English Anglican master of the Temple
 Richard H. Alvey (1826–1906), American jurist